Levski Karlovo is a Bulgarian football club based in Karlovo, Plovdiv Province. Founded in 1923, it currently competes in the South-East Third League. The club's colors are blue and white. Levski Karlovo is where Bulgarian international Petar Aleksandrov began his career.

History

1923–2004
Since its founding in 1923, Levski has had 10 seasons in second division, finishing third in 1975, with the last one being in 1981/82, when they finished 17th. Petar Aleksandrov made his debut during that season, scoring 10 goals in 22 matches, before joining Slavia Sofia.

2004–2016: Re-founding
The club was dissolved in 2004 only to be re-established later that year. It remained in third division until 2016, when it was promoted.

2016–present: Return to Professional Football
On 27 July 2016, Levski was promoted to the newly formed Bulgarian Second League. On 8 August 2016, after 34 years in the amateur leagues, the club returned to professional football in a match against Lokomotiv Sofia on 8 August 2016, which they lost 2:3. On 20 September 2016, Vereya beat Levski with 2:0 in the First Round of Bulgarian Cup. After 9 defeats in their first 9 matches for the season, Levski finally notched a 2:0 win over PFC Bansko on 22 September 2016. On 10 December 2016, they defeated group leader Etar Veliko Tarnovo 2:0. After finishing 16th in the table, the club was relegated back to third division for the 2017/18 season.

Honours
B Group (now Second League):
 Third-place (1): 1974–75
Bulgarian Cup:
 Second Round (1): 1993–94

Players

Current squad

Past seasons

League positions

References

External links
Club Profile at bgclubs.eu

Association football clubs established in 2004
Football clubs in Bulgaria
Karlovo
2004 establishments in Bulgaria